Rashid Rehman (13 October 1958 – 7 May 2014) was a prominent Pakistani lawyer and a regional coordinator for the Human Rights Commission of Pakistan (HRCP). He was well known for his work with clients who were poor or who were charged under Pakistan's vigorous blasphemy laws. After he became the defence lawyer for Junaid Hafeez in a controversial and widely publicized blasphemy case, he received death-threats, lastly in court in April 2014 by prosecution lawyers, but Rehman refused to abandon his client. As a result of this incident, complaints were laid with police and the District Bar Association but no action had been taken or protection provided when he was shot and killed by gunmen on 7 May 2014, and two colleagues injured.

See also 
 Shahid Azmi

References

External links
 Rashid Rehman Murdered
 BBC News Pakistan 'blasphemy lawyer' shot dead in Multan office
 Times of India. Rights advocate Rashid Rehman Khan gunned down in Pakistan
 Gunmen kill Pakistan lawyer defending blasphemy case
 In memoriam: Civil society, lawyers protest murder of Rashid Rehman
 Let's wait for the next Rashid Rehman to be murdered
 Rights advocate Rashid Rehman Khan gunned down in Multan

1958 births
2014 deaths
Pakistani lawyers
Deaths by firearm in Pakistan
Assassinated lawyers
Pakistani terrorism victims
People murdered in Punjab, Pakistan
2014 murders in Pakistan
Human rights lawyers
People from Lahore